Thunberga is a genus of east African huntsman spiders. The genus was first described by Peter Jäger in 2020, and it has only been found on Madagascar and on Mayotte. It is named after the environmental activist Greta Thunberg.

Species
 it contains twenty  nine species:
T. aliena Jäger, 2021 – Madagascar
T. befotaka Jäger, 2021 – Madagascar
T. boyanslat Jäger, 2021 – Madagascar
T. cala Jäger, 2021 – Madagascar
T. conductor Jäger, 2021 – Madagascar
T. daraina Jäger, 2021 – Madagascar
T. elongata Jäger, 2021 – Madagascar
T. gosura Jäger, 2021 – Madagascar
T. greta Jäger, 2020 – Madagascar
T. jaervii Jäger, 2021 – Madagascar
T. jyoti Jäger, 2021 – Madagascar
T. mafira Jäger, 2021 – Madagascar
T. malagassa (Strand, 1907) – Madagascar
T. malala Jäger, 2021 – Madagascar
T. mama Jäger, 2021 – Madagascar
T. matoma Jäger, 2021 – Madagascar
T. milloti Jäger, 2021 – Madagascar
T. nossibeensis (Strand, 1907) (type) – Madagascar
T. panusilem Jäger, 2021 – Madagascar
T. paulyi Jäger, 2021 – Madagascar
T. platnicki Jäger, 2021 – Madagascar
T. rothorum Jäger, 2021 – Madagascar
T. rugosa Jäger, 2021 – Madagascar
T. samsagala Jäger, 2021 – Madagascar
T. septifera (Strand, 1908) – Madagascar
T. soruag Jäger, 2021 – Madagascar
T. v-insignita Jäger, 2021 – Madagascar
T. wasserthali Jäger, 2021 – Madagascar, Mayotte
T. woodae Jäger, 2021 – Madagascar

See also
 Olios
 Rhitymna
 List of Sparassidae species

References

Further reading

Sparassidae genera
Spiders of Africa
Greta Thunberg